Vladan Matić (born 28 April 1970) is a Serbian former handball player and current coach of Hungarian club Grundfos Tatabánya KC. He also holds Hungarian citizenship.

Playing career
Matić made his professional debut with his hometown club Metaloplastika. He later played for Partizan (1993–1995 and 1997–2001) and Crvena zvezda (1995–1997). In 2001, Matić moved abroad to Hungary and stayed with Pick Szeged until 2007.

Matić represented Serbia and Montenegro (known as FR Yugoslavia until 2003), winning two bronze medals at the World Championships (1999 and 2001). He also participated in the 2000 Summer Olympics and two European Championships (2002 and 2004).

Coaching career
Matić started his coaching career at Pick Szeged in early 2007 and remained in charge until late 2009. He later coached Ferencváros (2009–2011) and Celje (2011–2013). In October 2013, Matić was named as head coach of the Serbia national team. He resigned from his position in June 2014. In 2018 he acquired Hungarian citizenship, and as well became the coach of the  Hungary men's national handball team along with István Csoknyai which lasted until 2019. He is currently the head coach of Grundfos Tatabánya KC.

References

External links
 EHF record
 Olympic record

1970 births
Living people
Sportspeople from Šabac
Naturalized citizens of Hungary
Yugoslav male handball players
Serbian male handball players
Olympic handball players of Yugoslavia
Handball players at the 2000 Summer Olympics
RK Metaloplastika players
RK Partizan players
RK Crvena zvezda players
SC Pick Szeged players
Serbian handball coaches